Corey S. Nakatani (born October 21, 1970 in Covina, California, United States) is an American Thoroughbred horse racing jockey. He got his big break in 1990 when he rode Itsallgreektome to win big stakes races.

Nakatani has long resided on the Southern California circuit of Santa Anita Park, Hollywood Park, and Del Mar racetrack. On October 8, 2011, he won six races in one day including two grade one victories.

, Nakatani has won more than 3,750 races including the Kentucky Oaks twice, one time on Lite Light and the other riding Pike Place Dancer, the Canadian International Stakes, the Strub Stakes four times, the Dubai Golden Shaheen, and ten Breeders' Cups, three of which were won consecutively between 1996 and 1998 in the Breeders' Cup Sprint.  He has never won the Kentucky Derby in 17 tries, his closest finish being second on Nehro in 2011.  In 2006, he ranked sixth among United States jockeys with 145 wins on 738 mounts, with earnings of $14,001,900.

Nakatani is married to his second wife, Lisa, and has two daughters, Lilah and Brittany, and two sons, Matthew, who currently plays football for the University of Louisville, and Austin. Brittany, Matthew, and Austin are from a previous marriage to Michele Dollase, daughter of trainer Wallace Dollase.  His late father Roy Nakatani, a Japanese American, was born in a World War II internment camp and spent time at Santa Anita Park when it was a relocation camp.  Corey's mother is Marie Nakatani and he is one of ten children.

Corey was a champion high school wrestler who became intrigued by racing after visiting Santa Anita with his father after a wrestling tournament at the age of sixteen.  Nakatani eventually approached horse trainer Roger Stein for work.  After three days of mucking out stalls and walking horses, he decided he wanted to ride even though he had never been on a horse before.  Stein then suggested that he get some experience on a working farm, so he learned the ropes on the Thoroughbred farm of Tony Matos.  He then went on and broke and galloped horses for Johnny Longden and Longden's son, Eric Longden before starting his career as a jockey.  He graduated from jockey school in Castaic, California, and won his first race, a dead heat, in Caliente, Mexico in 1988 aboard Blue King.  He moved to Southern California in April 1989, and became the leading apprentice jockey that same year.  His current residence is Southern California.

Nakatani won his 3,500th race at Aqueduct Racetrack on November 17, 2011 aboard Grand Strategy in the eighth race of the day.

Nakatani has ridden a number of notable horses including Jackson Bend, Nehro, Colonel John, Lava Man, Thor's Echo, Aragorn, Rock Hard Ten, Sarafan, Indian Blessing, Lite Light, Relaxed Gesture, Sandpit, Serena's Song, Bolt d'Oro, Silic, and Lit de Justice.

In the 2015 Kentucky Derby, won by American Pharoah, Nakatani was the jockey of Frammento, which placed 15th. Weeks earlier, the jockey had broken his collarbone in a March 17 spill at Santa Anita. In the 2014 Kentucky Derby, he finished sixth on Dance With Fate.

Corey Nakatani announced his retirement on November 23, 2019, but had not ridden since November 2018 due to injury 

He also is a golfer who carries a three handicap. His role models are Tiger Woods and Fred Couples. His favorite horse of all-time is Lava Man.  Nakatani's current agent is Matt Nakatani.

References

Year-end charts

American jockeys
Sportspeople from California
1970 births
Living people
People from Covina, California
American sportspeople of Japanese descent